Butters is a surname. Notable people with the surname include:
Bill Butters (born 1951), retired World Hockey Association and National Hockey League player
Charles Butters (1854–1933), American metallurgist, engineer, and mine owner
Frank Butters (1878–1957), Austrian racehorse trainer
Fred Butters (1904–1988), English rugby league footballer
Guy Butters (born 1969), English professional footballer
John Butters (1885–1969), Australian electrical engineer
Lily Butters (1894–1980), Canadian founder of the Cecil Butters Memorial Hospital
Tom Butters (baseball) (1938–2016), American college sports administrator and baseball pitcher
Tom Butters (politician) (1925–2015), Canadian politician
Wes Butters (born 1979), British radio broadcaster

See also
Butter (surname)
Buttrose, a surname

English-language surnames
Patronymic surnames